Milestones is a 1916 British silent drama film directed by Thomas Bentley and starring Isobel Elsom, Owen Nares and Minna Grey. It is an adaptation of the 1912 West End play Milestones by Arnold Bennett and Edward Knoblock. Four years later an American film of the same title was released. As of August 2010, the film is listed as one of the British Film Institute's "75 Most Wanted" lost films.

Plot
A young anarchist and shipbuilder refuses to listen to his conservative father.

Cast
 Isobel Elsom as Lady Monkhurst
 Owen Nares as Lord Monkhurst
 Campbell Gullan as Sir John Rhead
 Minna Grey as Gertrude Rhead
 Mary Lincoln as Rose Sibley
 Hubert Harben as Sam Sibley
 Esme Hubbard as Nancy Sibley
 Cecil Morton York as Joseph Sibley
 Roy Travers as Arthur Preece
 Lionel d'Aragon as Andrew MacLean
 Herbert Daniel as Richard Sibley
 Ernest A. Graham as Ned Pym
 Winifred Delavente as the Honourable Muriel Pym
 Molly Hamley-Clifford as Mrs. Rhead

See also
 List of lost films

References

External links
 BFI 75 Most Wanted entry, with extensive notes
 
 Milestones at SilentEra

1916 films
1916 drama films
1916 lost films
British drama films
British silent feature films
British black-and-white films
Films directed by Thomas Bentley
Lost British films
1910s British films
Silent drama films